Homalopoma granuliferum is a species of sea snail, a marine gastropod mollusk in the family Colloniidae.

Description
The height of the shell varies between 4 mm and 7 mm.

Distribution
This marine species occurs off Japan and in the East China Sea.

References

External links
 

Colloniidae
Gastropods described in 1940